Guam competed at the 2017 Asian Indoor and Martial Arts Games held in Ashgabat, Turkmenistan from September 17 to 27. Guam sent a delegation consisting of 34 participants in the competition. Guam didn't receive any medal at the Games.

Guam made its first appearance at an Asian Indoor and Martial Arts Games for the first time along with other Oceania nations.

Participants

References 

Nations at the 2017 Asian Indoor and Martial Arts Games
2017 in Guamanian sports
Guam at multi-sport events